Gudivada Amarnath (born ) is an Indian politician from the state of Andhra Pradesh. He is elected as the Member of the Legislative Assembly (MLA) from Anakapalle Assembly constituency in 2019 to the Andhra Pradesh Legislative Assembly representing the YSR Congress Party.

Early life 
Gudivada Amarnath was born to Gudivada Gurunadha Rao, a former politician and Member of Parliament from Anakapalli Lok Sabha constituency, and Nagamani. He graduated with an engineering degree.

Career 
Gudivada Amarnath and his mother, Nagamani, were members of Indian National Congress. They quit Congress and joined Telugu Desam Party (TDP) after the death of his father. In March 2014, they both quit TDP and joined YSR Congress Party.

References

Living people
Year of birth missing (living people)
YSR Congress Party politicians
Indian National Congress politicians from Andhra Pradesh
Telugu Desam Party politicians
People from Visakhapatnam district
Andhra Pradesh MLAs 2019–2024